Zoopilus is a monotypic genus of cnidarians belonging to the family Fungiidae. The only species is Zoopilus echinatus.

References

Fungiidae
Scleractinia genera